Sheila Murray is a Canadian writer. Her debut novel Finding Edward was published in 2022, and was a shortlisted finalist for the Governor General's Award for English-language fiction at the 2022 Governor General's Awards.

Finding Edward centres on Cyril Rowntree, a young mixed-race man from Jamaica who moves to Toronto as an international student, and connects with Edward Davina, an isolated elderly man whose life followed a similar path. It was published in July 2022 by Cormorant Books.

Murray was born in St Albans, England, and emigrated to Canada with her family as a teenager. She is based in Hamilton, Ontario, where she coordinates a climate change activist project. She has also published short fiction in various Canadian literary magazines.

References

21st-century Canadian novelists
21st-century Canadian short story writers
21st-century Canadian women writers
Black Canadian women
Black Canadian writers
British emigrants to Canada
Canadian women novelists
Canadian women short story writers
Living people
People from St Albans
Writers from Hamilton, Ontario
Year of birth missing (living people)